South Bolaang Mongondow Regency is a regency of North Sulawesi Province of Indonesia. It covers an area of 1,932.30 km2, and had a population of 57,001 at the 2010 Census, which rose to 69,791 at the 2020 Census. The principal town lies at Molibagu.

Administration 
At the time of the 2010 Census, the Regency was divided into five districts (kecamatan), but two additional districts (Helumo and Tomini) have subsequently been created by splitting of existing districts. The seven districts are tabulated below with their areas and their populations at the 2010 Census and the 2020 Census. The table also includes the number of administrative villages (rural desa and urban kelurahan) in each district, and its postal codes.

Administrative districts 
At the time of the 2010 Census, the Regency was divided into five districts (kecamatan). However in 2016 two additional districts were created - Mooat District and Motongkad District. The districts are tabulated below with their areas and their populations at the 2010 Census and the 2020 Census. The table also includes the numbers of administrative villages (desa) in each district and its postal code.

Notes: (a) the 2010 population of Tomini District is included in the figure for Posigadan District, from which it was cut out. (b) the 2010 population of Helumo District is included in the figure for Bolaang Uki District, from which it was cut out. (c) including four offshore islands - Babi, Kelapa, Pondan Mointok and Pondan Moloben.

References

Regencies of North Sulawesi